Tigran Khzmalyan (also known as Xmalian) is an Armenian independent filmmaker, screenwriter, producer, and political activist. Since 2018, Khzmalyan has served as the Chairman of the European Party of Armenia.

Education
1979-1984 - Yerevan State University, Department of Russian Philology
1990-1992 - Moscow Highest Courses for Film Directors, Russia
1994, 1998 - International Writing Courses, Reuters, BBC, London, UK

Political and social activism
Between 19881990, Khzmalyan was a participant in the Karabakh movement for the unification of Nagorno-Karabakh with Armenia. Between 19911993, he worked as a war correspondent for Armenian and international media in Nagorno-Karabakh, as well as an information assistant to the chairman of the Nagorno-Karabakh Supreme Council, Georgi Petrosian. Between 19931996, he worked as a political analyst for the Armenian Assembly of America, a lobby group of the Armenian diaspora in Washington, D.C. Between 19971998, he was appointed a Deputy Director of UNDP in Armenia. Between 19982005, he was the general manager of Yerevan Film Studio. In 2009, together with Jirair Sefilian and Alexander Yenikomshian, Khzmalyan founded the Sardarapat Movement.

In early 2012, Khzmalyan was one of the leaders of the Mashtots Park Movement. Since 2014, he quit his cooperation with the Sardarapat Movement due to disagreements on the role of Russia in the Russo-Ukrainian War and in regional developments. Khzmalyan held an anti-Kremlin position, claiming that Vladimir Putin and his KGB regime had annihilated Armenian statehood and colonized Armenia. In 2016, he joined veteran dissident Paruyr Hayrikyan in a pro-Western political movement, called Independence. He underwent three trials on accusations of disobedience to the police during public rallies in 2012, 2014 and 2015.

On 6 November 2018, Tigran Khzmalyan along with his supporters, established the European Party of Armenia, being elected as the party's Chairman.

In May 2020, Khzmalyan endorsed and joined the National Democratic Pole.

On 10 May 2021, Khzmalyan announced that the European Party of Armenia is leaving the National Democratic Pole alliance, and that the party would participate in the 2021 Armenian parliamentary elections independently.

Khzmalyan participates in the Standing Committee on European Integration as an observer member.

Filmography

References

External links 
 The amazing vanishing movie by BBC News
 30th Montpellier Mediterranean Film Festival
 Թուրքերը դիմել են Իրանի հյուպատոսարան, պահանջում են Թեհրանում չցուցադրել Հայոց ցեղասպանության մասին ֆիլմը

Armenian film directors
Armenian screenwriters
Armenian documentary film directors
Armenian politicians
Television in Armenia
1963 births
Living people
Film people from Yerevan
Yerevan State University alumni
Leaders of political parties in Armenia